Zakaria Amrani (born 29 March 1991, Rotterdam) is a Dutch footballer and futsal player.

Club career
Amrani signed for the FC Utrecht youth team in July 2009, and made his senior debut for them the next season, in an October 2010 Eredivisie match against Vitesse Arnhem.

He then played for amateurs Haaglandia in the Dutch Topklasse and Magreb'90.

Futsal
He also plays for futsal club FC Marlene.

International career
Amrani made his debut for the Netherlands national futsal team in January 2014 against Hungary.

References

1991 births
Living people
Footballers from Rotterdam
Dutch sportspeople of Moroccan descent
Association football midfielders
Dutch footballers
Dutch men's futsal players
FC Utrecht players
Willem II (football club) players
Eredivisie players
Derde Divisie players
Magreb '90 players